Joe Lapis (10 April 1899 – 26 October 1991) was a Hungarian sound engineer. He was nominated for an Oscar for Best Special Effects on the film The Boys from Syracuse at the 13th Academy Awards. He worked on more than 170 films during his career.

References

External links

1899 births
1991 deaths
Hungarian audio engineers
People from Borsod-Abaúj-Zemplén County
Hungarian emigrants to the United States